Tatsiana Tarsunova (born July 23, 1967 in Minsk) is a Belarusian female curler. She is right-handed.

Achievements
Belarusian Mixed Curling Championship: gold (2018).
Belarusian Mixed Doubles Curling Championship: gold (2019), silver (2018).

Teams and events

Women's

Mixed

Mixed doubles

References

External links
 
 

1967 births
Living people
Belarusian female curlers
Belarusian curling champions
Sportspeople from Minsk